The Copa Antonio Peña (Spanish for "The Antonio Peña Cup") is an annual professional wrestling tournament held by Lucha Libre AAA Worldwide (AAA) once a year. The tournament is named in memory of Antonio Peña, the founder of AAA that died on October 5, 2006. The tournament is part of the annual Antonio Peña Memorial show held annually around the anniversary of Peña's death. The tournament is a Gauntlet match featuring eight to thirteen AAA wrestlers ranging from mid-card to main eventers. The events are televised as a special feature on Televisa. The Cup is not defended like a championship and does not automatically give the winner a shot at the AAA Mega Championship. As is tradition with AAA major events the wrestlers compete inside a hexagonal wrestling ring and not the four sided ring the promotion uses for television events and house shows.

Copa Antonio Peña winners

Antonio Peña Memorial Shows
The Copa Antonio Peña is one of the featured events on the annual Antonio Peña Memorial Show (Homenaje a Antonio Peña in Spanish), which has been held since 2007 around the anniversary of Peña's death. In 2011, the first two Memorial Shows were retrospectively renamed Héroes Inmortales I and Héroes Inmortales II.

References

 
Professional wrestling memorial shows